George Allen Hinkle, Jr. (born March 17, 1965) is a former professional American football player who played defensive end for six seasons for the San Diego Chargers, the Minnesota Vikings, and the Cincinnati Bengals.  Hinkle is now the head coach of his alma mater, Pacific High School. Hinkle took over the program on a 49-game losing streak before leading them to a 2–8 record in his first year, and a 3–7 record in his second year. The third-year Coach Hinkle led the Indians to an 8–3 record, the first winning season in over 10 years and first Four Rivers Conference title and District title in 15 years. Coach Hinkle's District Championship team was led by his son, George Hinkle III, and Blake Arnette, a Lindenwood University signee.

References

External links
 Statistics

1965 births
Living people
Players of American football from St. Louis
American football defensive ends
American football defensive tackles
Arizona Wildcats football players
San Diego Chargers players
Minnesota Vikings players
Cincinnati Bengals players